This is a list of films which have placed number one at the weekend box office in the United States during 2003.

Number-one films

Highest-grossing films

Calendar Gross
Highest-grossing films of 2003 by Calendar Gross

In-Year Release

See also
 List of American films — American films by year
 Lists of box office number-one films

References

Chronology

2003
United States
2003 in American cinema